Settle is an indie rock band from Easton, Pennsylvania currently signed to Epitaph Records whose debut album, At Home We Are Tourists, was released May 19, 2009. The signing of Settle is part of Epitaph's efforts to expand its sound beyond its pop punk roots.

Discography

Studio albums

References

External links
 Settle Official Website
 Settle on Epitaph Records

Indie rock musical groups from Pennsylvania
Epitaph Records artists